The Ozone School is a historic school building at 14137 Arkansas Highway 21 in Ozone, Arkansas.  It is a single-story masonry structure, built out of coursed fieldstone blocks and covered by gable-on-hip roof with exposed rafter ends.  Its front entrance is sheltered by a distinctive projecting tower, with arched openings at the base and a transverse gabled roof above.  The school was built in 1942 with funding from the Works Progress Administration, and was used as a public school until 1957, when the local district was consolidated with that of Lamar. The building was listed on the National Register of Historic Places in 2015.

See also
National Register of Historic Places listings in Johnson County, Arkansas

References

School buildings on the National Register of Historic Places in Arkansas
Buildings and structures in Johnson County, Arkansas
National Register of Historic Places in Johnson County, Arkansas